Withington is a Cotswold village and civil parish in Gloucestershire, England, about  southeast of Cheltenham and  north of Cirencester.  The River Coln runs through the village. The parish includes the hamlets of Hilcot, Foxcote and Cassey Compton. The parish population taken at the 2011 census was 532.

The site of a Roman villa lies to the south of the village. Remains of the villa were rediscovered in 1811 by Samuel Lysons, and investigations by the Time Team television programme for an episode first broadcast in 2006 found further Romano-British buildings east of the villa, towards the river.

The origin of the name is unclear but it is found in records as early as 737 AD (Wudiandun, which would mean the hill of Wudia: Wudia may be a real settler or the legendary Germanic hero Witege). The other English places called Withington may have different origins. In his 1955 work, H. P. R. Finberg argued for continuity between Anglo-Saxon Withington and an earlier Roman settlement. During Saxon times there was an important monastery at Withington.

The parish church of St Michael and All Angels dates from the 12th century and is a Grade I listed building. The church was altered in the 15th century when the Perpendicular clerestory and higher tower were added, and has been described as "a typical example of an important Cotswold church".

From 1891 to 1961, Withington had a railway station on the Midland and South Western Junction Railway which ran between Cirencester and Cheltenham.

The Mill Inn, now the only public house in Withington, is credited locally with creating the popular "chicken in a basket" fried chicken and chips meal in the 1960s.

The 2000 Trees music festival is held annually at Upcote Farm, near the village.

From April to May 2021, it was filmed as the fictional village of Cotson for the folk horror film Men, released in 2022 and directed by Alex Garland.

References

External links

 Withington Parish Council
 Withington at GenUKI
 Victoria County History

Villages in Gloucestershire
Cotswold District
Civil parishes in Gloucestershire